Samuel Ehi Eguavoen (born February 22, 1993) is an American football linebacker for the Miami Dolphins of the National Football League (NFL). He played college football at Texas Tech.

Early years
Eguavoen played high school football at Lakeview Centennial High School in Garland, Texas, recording 118 total tackles, four sacks, one interception, two pass deflections, two forced fumbles and two fumble recoveries his senior year. He earned Second-team District 10-5A honors. He was rated a three-star prospect by Rivals.com and ESPN.com. Eguavoen also played basketball at Lakeview Centennial.

College career
Eguavoen played for the Texas Tech Red Raiders of Texas Tech University from 2011 to 2014. He played in twelve games, starting five, while totaling 30 tackles his freshman season in 2011 and was named to Rivals.com's Big 12 All-Freshman Team Defense. He appeared in thirteen games, starting nine, and accumulated 52 tackles in 2012. Eguavoen played in thirteen games, all starts, while recording 70 tackles, 1.5 sacks, three quarterback hurries, two pass breakups, one forced fumble and one fumble recovery his junior year in 2013. He appeared in ten games, all starts, while totaling 74 tackles, two sacks, two pass breakups, two forced fumbles, two fumble recoveries, one interception and one quarterback hurry his senior season in 2014. He also garnered Honorable Mention All-Big 12 recognition in 2014.

Professional career

Eguavoen went undrafted in the 2015 NFL Draft and spent the year working in Dallas, Texas.

Saskatchewan Roughriders (CFL)
He signed with the Saskatchewan Roughriders of the CFL on February 24, 2016. He made his CFL debut on June 30, 2016, recording four defensive tackles against the Toronto Argonauts. Eguavoen played three seasons for the Roughriders, playing in 38 games for the team and contributing with 159 defensive tackles, 14 special teams tackles, four sacks, two forced fumbles and one interception. Eguavoen, who was scheduled to be a free agent February 12, 2019, was released by the Riders on January 2, 2019 to pursue NFL opportunities.

Miami Dolphins (NFL)
On January 7, 2019, Eguavoen signed with the Miami Dolphins of the NFL. He was placed on the reserve/COVID-19 list by the team on August 19, 2020, and was activated the next day.

On March 16, 2022, Eguavoen signed a one-year contract extension with the Dolphins.

References

External links
College stats
PFR

Living people
1993 births
American football linebackers
Canadian football linebackers
African-American players of American football
African-American players of Canadian football
Texas Tech Red Raiders football players
Saskatchewan Roughriders players
Players of American football from Texas
People from Garland, Texas
Sportspeople from the Dallas–Fort Worth metroplex
Sportspeople from Edo State
American sportspeople of Nigerian descent
Miami Dolphins players
21st-century African-American sportspeople